Ixhuacán, or Ixhuacán de los Reyes, is a city in the Mexican state of Veracruz. It is bordered by Teocelo, Xico and Coatepec. Coffee is the chief product of Ixhuacán de los Reyes.

It serves as the municipal seat for the surrounding municipality of the same name.

History 
In August, 1519 Hernán Cortés passed through Ixhuacán on his way to Tenochtitlan. Both Cortes and his chronicler Francisco Lopez de Gomara described the town as having a fort.

External links 
 Ixhuacán de los Reyes - several pictures of the town, and surroundings.
  Municipal Official Site
  Municipal Official Information

Populated places in Veracruz